The 2007 Champions Youth Cup was the first and only staging of the Champions Youth Cup, a proposed annual football tournament. It was supported by the G-14 group and was intended to be a Club World Championship for the Under-19 teams of some of the world's largest clubs. It took place in Malaysia from 5 August to 19 August 2007. It featured sixteen teams: eleven European teams, two teams from South America, a host invitee team from Europe, a host invitee team from Asia and the U-19 national team of the tournament hosts, Malaysia. Each match lasted only 70 minutes, and, in the event of a draw in the knockout stage, there was no extra time. A second edition of the tournament, was planned for August 2008. However it was canceled in June, two months before the start, because of a dispute between the Football Association of Malaysia and the Gifted Group, the tournament organizers.

Groups

Group A

Group B

Group C

Group D

Knockout stage

Quarter finals

Semi finals

Third place play-off

Final

Top scorers

References

External links
Champions Youth Cup 2007 official website

2007
2007
2007 in Malaysian football
2007 in Brazilian football
2007–08 in English football
2007–08 in Italian football
2007–08 in Dutch football
2007–08 in Spanish football
2007–08 in Qatari football
2007–08 in French football
2007–08 in Argentine football
2007–08 in German football
2007–08 in Portuguese football